The Northern Great Basin Experimental Range is a large livestock range operated by the Oregon State University's Eastern Oregon Agricultural Research Center and the United States Department of Agriculture's Agricultural Research Service.

The Northern Great Basin Experimental Range is a testing ground for the study of fauna growth for purposes of livestock grazing in eastern Oregon's desert environment. Experimental activities are coordinated out of a research station in Burns, Oregon. 

The local populace wanted scientific study of summertime floods that originated on mountain watersheds and were seriously damaging farms and rural communities. Severe flooding during the latter part of the 19th century and early part of the 20th century led to the establishment of what was then-called the Utah Experiment Station in 1912.

References

Further reading

External links
 A video tour of the Northern Great Basin Experimental Range
 Official website
 US Forest Service

Oregon State University
United States Department of Agriculture facilities